Atreyee D. A. V. Public School, Mangalpur, Balurghat, India, (formerly The Atreyee English Medium School), Balurghat, affiliated to Central Board of Secondary Education (CBSE) was the first English medium school of the city Balurghat as well as of the district South Dinajpur

History
The school was established in 1976. It has co-educational classes, from Nursery to Class XII. Initially classes were held at the District Library, near Balurghat College, later it was shifted to Mongalpur, in the western part of Balurghat which is its present location. In Balurghat town, it is colloquially referred to as KG School as it was the first institution having kindergarten facilities in the city.

Uniform
The uniform for boys is maroon trousers and white shirt with a maroon tie, 'ADAVPS' is printed on it. For girls up to 8th standard, the uniform is maroon skirt and white shirt with maroon tie and 9th standard onwards, salwar and dupatta in maroon and qameez in white combination — with black shoes and white socks (for both boys and girls).

Education
The first batch of students who appeared for board exams for Class-X was in 1986. That batch passed their Class-XII board exams in the year 1988. The students have the option to opt either Science or Commerce or Arts.  The school follows the new Comprehensive and Compulsory Examinations scheme for academics.

Campus
ADAVPS, Balurghat is a co- educational, day school. The School consists of an Administrative Block and 2 Academic Blocks. The Primary Block has classes Playgroup to Class – V whereas the Secondary Block resides Classes VI – XII; provides the following streams: Science, Commerce and Humanities. Other academic facilities available for students include air-conditioned laboratories for Computer, Physics, Chemistry, Biology. The school has smart class rooms with LCD and OHP facilities, playgrounds and gardens and a library. The school also provides separate classrooms for Music, Dance.

Taking Over of DAV on AEMS:2009
In 2009, the school was taken over by the Dayanand Anglo-Vedic Schools System and is now managed by the Dayanand Anglo-Vedic College Trust and Management Society, which renamed the school from The Atreyee English Medium School to Atreyee D. A. V. Public School.

References 

Primary schools in West Bengal
High schools and secondary schools in West Bengal
Schools affiliated with the Arya Samaj
Balurghat
Educational institutions established in 1976
1976 establishments in West Bengal
Private schools in West Bengal